Agustín Sebastián Miranda Cambón (born 28 November 1992) is a Uruguayan footballer who plays as a midfielder for Plaza Colonia in the Uruguayan Primera División.

References

External links
Profile at Football Database

1992 births
Living people
Sud América players
Central Español players
Oriental players
Villa Teresa players
Plaza Colonia players
Uruguayan Primera División players
Uruguayan Segunda División players
Uruguayan footballers
Association football midfielders